Dr. Mahendra Munjpara is an Indian politician serving as Minister of State for AYUSH and Minister of State for Woman and Child Development. He is member of parliament to the 17th Lok Sabha from Surendranagar Lok Sabha constituency, Gujarat. He won the 2019 Indian general election being a Bharatiya Janata Party candidate. Before his political career, he has been a practicing doctor in Surendranagar as a Cardiologist and Echocardiologist.

References

Living people
India MPs 2019–present
Lok Sabha members from Gujarat
Bharatiya Janata Party politicians from Gujarat
1968 births